The 1960 Kilkenny Senior Hurling Championship was the 66th staging of the Kilkenny Senior Hurling Championship since its establishment by the Kilkenny County Board.

On 9 October 1960, Bennettsbridge won the championship after a 4-05 to 3-04 defeat of Glenmore in the final. It was their seventh championship title overall and their second title in succession.

Results

First round

Second round

Semi-finals

Final

References

Kilkenny Senior Hurling Championship
Kilkenny Senior Hurling Championship